Milz may refer to:

Places
Milz (river), of Bavaria and Thuringia, Germany
Milz (Römhild), a village in Thuringia, Germany, part of the town Römhild

People
Jules Alexandre Milz (1861–1902), Belgian soldier who explored the northeast of the Congo Free State.